The Mohave Canyon is located on the Colorado River, south of Needles, California. It is part of Topock Gorge, a mountainous canyon and gorge section of the Colorado River located between Interstate 40 and Lake Havasu.

References

Colorado River
Landforms of San Bernardino County, California